K12 is the second highest peak in the Saltoro Mountains, a subrange of the Karakoram range in the Siachen region of Ladakh. Its name comes from its designation given during the original survey of the Karakoram range. In 1984, an Indian army expedition under Colonel Prem Chand took hold of this peak, from the side of Siachen glacier by traversing from the west.

K12 lies to the southwest of the Siachen Glacier; the K12 glacier heads on its northeast slopes and feeds the Siachen. The western slopes of K12 drain to the Bilafond Glacier system, and thence to the Dansam River, and eventually the Indus River.

K12 was used for training for the Mount Everest expedition of the Indian Army in 1985. Apart from this, K12 has seen little climbing activity, partly because of the unsettled political situation and the continued military presence in the area. It was first attempted in 1960, after a reconnaissance visit by famed explorer Eric Shipton in 1957. After a further unsuccessful attempt by a Japanese party in 1971, another Japanese expedition put two climbers, Shinichi Takagi and Tsutomu Ito, on the summit.  They fell and died on the descent, and their bodies were not recovered. Another Japanese expedition returned in 1975 and made the second ascent.

See also 
 List of Ultras of the Western Himalayas
 Siachen conflict
 Actual Ground Position Line
 Indira Col
 Sia La
 Ghent Kangri
 Saltoro Kangri
 Bilafond La
 Chumik Glacier
 Gyong La
 NJ9842

References

Sources 
 Jerzy Wala, Orographical Sketch Map of the Karakoram, Swiss Foundation for Alpine Research, 1990.
 Jill Neate, High Asia: an illustrated history of the 7,000 metre peaks, The Mountaineers, 1989.

Mountains of Ladakh
Seven-thousanders of the Karakoram